Camotes Islands is a group of islands in the Camotes Sea, Philippines. The island group is located east of Cebu Island, southwest of Leyte Island, and north of Bohol Island. According to the 2015 census, it has a population of 102,996.

Sometimes known as the "Lost Horizon of the south", within recent years Camotes has seen increased visitors and tourism and a growing expatriate community.  Apart from natural attractions on land, there is also a score of dive sites around the islands.

Geography

Camotes Islands comprises three major islands and one minor islet, divided between four municipalities. On Poro Island are the municipalities of Poro and Tudela. Pacijan Island's sole municipality is San Francisco. Ponson Island's sole municipality is Pilar. Tulang Island is an islet and part of San Francisco. The main islands of Pacijan and Poro are connected by a  causeway. Tulang is located a short distance north of Pacijan.

The Camotes are low-lying with several hills, some used for telecommunications relay stations.

Demographics

Languages

Cebuano is the primary language, then English and Filipino. School children are taught all three languages.

Porohanon or Camotes Visayan is spoken in the town of Poro only, and is one of the most endangered languages in the Visayas. The language is classified as distinct from Sebwano (Bisaya) by the Komisyon ng Wikang Filipino and is vital to the culture and arts of the Porohanon people.

The dialect is very similar to the language spoken in the rest of Camotes Islands and throughout the province of Cebu, Northern Mindanao and other parts of the Visayas. Porohanon is distinguished by the way the locals substitute the /y/ sound for /z/.  Example: maayong buntag (good morning) in Cebuano would be changed to maazong buntag in Porohanon, na-a diha (in Cebuano), ara dira (in Porohanon)

Transport

Environment

Climate

Tropical monsoon climate (Köppen climate classification category "Am"), with rainfall more or less evenly distributed throughout the year – Coronas climate type IV.

Biota

By Presidential Proclamation 2152 of 1981, the islands of Ponson, Poro and Pacihan were declared Mangrove swamp forest reserves.

Exemplars of the rare, critically endangered tree species Cebu Cinnamon (Cinnamomum cebuense) have been discovered on the Camotes Islands.

Palm trees are the dominant plant on the islands. There are also numerous native varieties of fruit including banana, mango and pineapple.

History

Protohistory

Little is known of the islands' early history.  The twentieth century saw a number of archaeological studies, but nothing of major significance emerged.

An early visitor was Carl Guthe, who led an expedition from the University of Michigan which spent three years 1923–1925 investigating and exploring many sites across the archipelago. He conducted an archaeological dig in a cave site on Tulang. Guthe reported it to contain bone fragments and teeth of about 60 individuals. Associated grave goods included earthenware pottery, shell bracelets, bronze and iron artefacts (iron tang, bronze chisel, iron blade), glass and stone beads, hammerstone and pestle. Filed teeth were also recovered from this site.

Otley Beyer (Philippine's "Father of Anthropology") never visited, although he is reported to have described Camotes as a "basket of interesting archaeological finds."

In the early 1970s, residents unearthed a variety of artefacts dating back to the 16th century. An excavation at Mactang, a purok within Esperanza, Poro, revealed spears, daggers, swords, crosses, iron pendants and a skull pierced with an arrowhead. This heavily disturbed and looted site located along the shoreline of sitio Mactang was excavated by Bailen and Cabanilla of UP Diliman in the early 1990s and explored by Bersales and USC in 2001. Porcelain and earthenware sherds are strewn on the surface of what would otherwise have been a 13th- or 14th-century CE burial site.

In one barangay, Bailen and Cabanilla found a complex of caves which they believed had been inhabited by primitive people. Cabanilla asked municipal officials to preserve the site and wait while their project proposal would be approved. They planned to conduct a digging and leave whatever artefacts would be found in the caves. Meaning, they would transform the place into an onsite museum that should attract students, archaeologists. etc.

A few months later, Cabanilla returned to Camotes, having secured project funding from a foreign institution. To his surprise and dismay, despite earlier assurances of its safekeeping, he found the caves already mined of stone which had been sold to a sinter plant in Leyte by the mayor. Only one cave remained, but Cabanilla lost the drive and returned to Manila, his project scuttled.

Because of that, even the plan to set up a town museum for the artifacts dug during the survey was abandoned.

Spanish conquistadores

The islands were first mentioned by Antonio Pigafetta, one of the survivors on Ferdinand Magellan's fateful voyage, as they waited off the islands for several days before going on to Cebu in the first week of April 1521: 

Writing in 1582, Miguel de Loarca stated:

He also wrote:
"todos son de vna manera tienen tambien gallinas y puercos y algunas cabras frisoles y vnas Rayçes como batatas de sancto domingo qe llaman camotes
All are provided with fowls, swine, a few goats, beans, and a kind of root resembling the potatoes of Sancto Domingo, called by the natives camotes."  This remark is itself remarkable in that "camote" is the Hispanicized form of the Nahuatl (indigenous Mexican) word for "sweet potato", indicating a prior visit by a Spanish ship from Mexico.
Camotes Islands were previously a part of the Leyte province before being transferred to Cebu province during the American period.

Modern times

In 1942 Japanese forces occupied Camotes Islands. In 1945 Japanese soldiers massacred almost all of the inhabitants in Pilar which led to a war crimes trial after the war.  The liberation of the islands happened soon after the massacre when Philippine and American soldiers landed and fought the remaining Japanese soldiers in the Battle of Camotes Islands.

Economy

The predominant industries on the Camotes Islands are farming (including corn, rice, pigs, chicken and cattle), fishing and tourism.

There are about 22 tourist resorts catering to both domestic and international visitors with many public and private beaches.

Also in the Camotes Islands you can find tourist spots such as Buho Rock, Greenlake Park, Mt. Calvary (Kalbaryo), Lake Danao and the vast mangrove swamp along the sides of the road from Pacijan (San Francisco) to Poro. There are many caves such as Bukilat Cave, Timubo Cave and Guadalupe Cave which has a fresh-water underground lake. There are also two waterfalls, one in Poro and one in Tudela. There is diving and snorkeling opportunities at some of the resorts.

The major employers are CELCO (Camotes Electric Cooperative), Camotes Hillside Academy and Kinoshita Pearl Farm. There is a small hospital. Fiesta Mall, the first mall on the island opened in 2015. A new integrated casino resort with condos is scheduled to open in December, 2016. Tourism in the key economic development for the future of the island with a focus on the white sand beaches, safe and clean environment.

There are two colleges on the island: Cebu Technology University (Camotes) and Mount Moriah College.

Notes

References

Sources

External links

Mystical Tudela Website
How to get to Camotes Island
Camotes Islands Travel Guide
TourCamotes.Com: All About Camotes Islands, Cebu, Philippines
Cebu Destinations
Local government site

Beaches of the Philippines
Islands of Cebu